The Quarterly Review of Biology is a peer-reviewed scientific journal covering all aspects of biology. It was established in 1926 by Raymond Pearl. In the 1960s it was purchased by the Stony Brook Foundation when the editor H. Bentley Glass became academic vice president of Stony Brook University. The editor-in-chief is Daniel E. Dykhuizen (Stony Brook University). It is currently published by the University of Chicago Press.

Aims and scope
The journal publishes review articles. Beyond the core biological sciences, the journal also covers related areas, including policy studies and the history and philosophy of science. There is also a book review section.

Abstracting and indexing
The journal is abstracted and indexed in Biological Abstracts, BIOSIS Previews, and the Science Citation Index.

References

External links

Biology journals
University of Chicago Press academic journals
Publications established in 1926
Quarterly journals
English-language journals
Review journals